NDFA may refer to:
 National Drama Festivals Association
 Nondeterministic finite automaton (also abbreviated as NFA)
 North Dakota Fencing Association
 North Dakota Firefighter's Association